Dieverbrug is a village in the Dutch province of Drenthe. It is a part of the municipality of Westerveld, and lies about 17 km northwest of Hoogeveen.

Dieverbrug was home to 45 people in 1840. The lime kiln was built in 1925. It remained in function until 1952, but has remained as the local landmark.

Gallery

References

Populated places in Drenthe
Westerveld